Pere Marquette or Jacques Marquette (1637–1675) was a French Jesuit missionary and namesake of Marquette University.

Pere Marquette or Father Marquette may also refer to:

Locations and landmarks
Pere Marquette, the original name (before the village plat of 1867) of Ludington, Michigan
Pere Marquette Charter Township, Michigan
Pere Marquette River
Pere Marquette Hotel, a registered national landmark in Peoria, Illinois

Parks, monuments, and reserves
Father Marquette National Memorial in Straits State Park
Pere Marquette State Park in Grafton, Illinois
Pere Marquette State Forest in Michigan
Pere Marquette Park, a park in Milwaukee, Wisconsin
Pere Marquette Beach, Muskegon, Michigan
 Jacques Marquette (Knepper)
 Jacques Marquette (Trentanove)
 Pere Jacques Marquette (Queoff)

Transport
Pere Marquette Railway, in the Great Lakes region of the United States and Canada
Pere Marquette Rail-Trail in the central lower peninsula of Michigan
Pere Marquette (C&O train), a passenger train formerly operated by the Pere Marquette Railway and the Chesapeake and Ohio Railway
Pere Marquette (Amtrak train), a passenger train operated by Amtrak
Pere Marquette State Trail in the western lower peninsula of Michigan
SS Pere Marquette (disambiguation)

Other uses
Pere Marquette Lumber Company, 19th-century commercial holdings of Ludington, Michigan

See also
Marquette (disambiguation)